Lorne Wallace Duguid (April 4, 1910 – March 21, 1981) was a Canadian professional ice hockey player, born in Bolton, Ontario who played 135 games in the National Hockey League between 1931 and 1937 with the Montreal Maroons, Detroit Red Wings, and Boston Bruins. He was born in Bolton, Ontario.

Duguid scored his first NHL goal as a member of the Montreal Maroons.  It came in Boston Garden on January 17, 1933 in the Maroons' 6-2 loss to the Boston Bruins.

Career statistics

Regular season and playoffs

External links

Obituary at LostHockey.com

1910 births
1981 deaths
Boston Bruins players
Canadian ice hockey left wingers
Cleveland Barons (1937–1973) players
Detroit Red Wings players
Detroit Olympics (IHL) players
Ice hockey people from Ontario
Montreal Maroons players
People from Caledon, Ontario
Pittsburgh Hornets players
Providence Reds players
Windsor Bulldogs (1929–1936) players
Canadian expatriate ice hockey players in the United States